Pooja Kapur is the Indian Ambassador to the Kingdom of Denmark. She was formerly the Indian Ambassador to the Republic of Bulgaria and the Republic of North Macedonia.

Career 
Pooja Kapur joined the Indian Foreign Service in 1996. She served at the Indian Embassies in Paris and Brussels (accredited to the EU, Belgium and Luxembourg) and the Indian High Commissions in London and Kuala Lumpur. In the Ministry of External Affairs, New Delhi, she has held charges pertaining to India's relationship with Western Europe, South East Asia, the United Nations and the Commonwealth, including heading the ASEAN Multilateral Division. She assumed charge as Ambassador of India to the Republic of Bulgaria in July 2017, and was concurrently accredited as the Ambassador of India to the Republic of North Macedonia in November 2017. Pooja Kapur assumed charge as Ambassador of India to the Kingdom of Denmark in March 2021.

She was adjudged a LinkedIn Top Voice 2018, and was the only diplomat to make the list.

Personal life 
Pooja Kapur was a Chevening Scholar at the University of Oxford. She also has a Masters in Public Administration from the École nationale d’administration in Paris as well as a Bachelors and Masters in Political Science from the University of Delhi. A university topper and recipient of several academic scholarships and awards, she is fluent in English, French and Hindi.

Pooja Kapur is the daughter of an Indian Administrative Service officer. She is married to Ashwani Aggarwal and they have a teenage son, Aakash.

Publications 
Pooja Kapur is a published author, having co-authored her first book on politics at the age of twenty.

References 

Indian women ambassadors
Ambassadors of India to Bulgaria
Alumni of the University of Oxford
Delhi University alumni
Indian women political writers
Living people
Year of birth missing (living people)
Ambassadors of India to North Macedonia
Indian political writers
21st-century Indian women writers
21st-century Indian non-fiction writers
Chevening Scholars